Calpurnus is a genus of sea snails, marine gastropod mollusks in the family Ovulidae.

Species
Species within the genus Calpurnus include:
Calpurnus verrucosus (Linnaeus, 1758)

References

Ovulidae
Monotypic gastropod genera